Illya Aliyew (born 20 May 1991) is a Belarusian professional footballer who plays as a midfielder.

Personal life 
Aliyew is engaged with Belarusian handball player Natallia Vasileuskaya.

References

External links
Profile at teams.by

1991 births
Living people
Association football midfielders
Belarusian footballers
Belarusian expatriate footballers
Expatriate footballers in Romania
FC Neman Grodno players
FC Neman Mosty players
FC Belcard Grodno players
CS Gloria Bistrița-Năsăud footballers